The Nikitin NV-5, was a tandem-seat trainer aircraft designed and produced in the USSR from 1934.

Development
In 1934 Osaviakhim (Society for assistance to aviation and chemical industry), and AVIAVnito (Aviation Department of Vnito, all union scientific and technical research organisation), opened a competition for designing and building a safe aeroplane. Nikitin designed a small biplane with tandem seating, I-type wide chord inter-plane struts, rubber shock-isolating engine mounts and small semi-balloon tyres. The fuselage was built up from welded 30KhGSA steel tubing with plywood covering and the wings were constructed from wood with fabric covering. The first prototype had a Licence-built Renault MV-4 inverted in-line engine, but later variants used M-11 or MG-11 radial engines.

The NV-5 won the Osavaiakhim/ AVIAVnito competition in 1937 and was prepared for production, as the U-5, for Osaviakhim and UVVS. One U-5 was modified with a ShKAS machine gun under the starboard wing and four under-wing RS-82 rockets.

The most significant variant of the U-5 was the LSh (Legkii Shtabno – light staff aircraft),  built in 1942 at the request of the Moscow Defence HQ, this aircraft was used operationally on liaison and special missions from Leningrad to the Caucasus mountains. With a much more powerful MG-31F engine, Polikarpov I-153 upper wing, enclosed cabin, toughened rear cockpit with bench seating for two and aluminium lining, the LSh   had excellent STOL and range performance.

Variants
 NV-5 - Initial prototype with licence built Renault MV-4 engine.
 NV-5bis – Shvetsov MG-11F powered NV-5. (one built)
 U-5 – Prototype and four production aircraft with Shvetsov M-11 or Shvetsov M-11G engines. (Five built)
 U-5 bis – Five built 1939 for UVVS with Shvetsov MG-11F engines
 LSh – One LSh  built in 1942 (a.k.a. U-5/MG-31) with a 330 hp (246.01 kW) MG-31F.

Units using this aircraft/Operators (choose)
 UVVS - Soviet Air Force Training
 Osavaiakhim
 (LSh) - Moscow Defence HQ

Specifications (U-5)

See also

References

 Gunston, Bill. “The Osprey Encyclopaedia of Russian Aircraft 1875–1995”. London, Osprey. 1995.

External links
 https://web.archive.org/web/19991004085143/http://www.aviation.ru/Nikitin/

1930s Soviet civil utility aircraft
NV-5
Biplanes
Single-engined tractor aircraft
Aircraft first flown in 1937